Sir Chittampalam Abraham Gardiner (6 January 1899 – December 1960) was a Ceylon Tamil businessman and member of the Senate of Ceylon.

Early life and family
Gardiner was born on 6 January 1899. He was the son of Samuel Vairamuttu Gardiner and Salomapillai Bastiampillai. The Gardiner family were originally from Achchuvely and Manipay in northern Ceylon but later moved to Colombo.

Gardiner married Angeline Casie Chetty, daughter of Aloysius Mount Carmel Casie Chetty. They had an adopted son, Cyril Aloysius.

Career
Gardiner studied law before entering business. He pioneered the cinema business in Ceylon and established The Ceylon Theatres Limited, which is now one of Sri Lanka's largest conglomerates, on 29 September 1928. He controlled several leading businesses in Colombo and had interests in others including Cargills and Millers.

Gardiner was made a Knight of St. Sylvester in 1947 for his services to the Roman Catholic Church. He was also a Knight of St. Gregory. He was appointed to the Senate of Ceylon in 1947. He was knighted in the 1951 New Year Honours.

Gardiner was a Rotarian and made a number of large charitable endowments. He was a keen horse owner, his horse won the Governor's Cup in 1947. He died in December 1960.

Parson's Road, the site of Regal Theatre, Ceylon Theatres' first cinema, was renamed Sir Chittampalam A. Gardiner Mawatha.

References

1899 births
1960 deaths
Ceylonese Knights Bachelor
Knights of St. Gregory the Great
Knights of the Order of St. Sylvester
Members of the Senate of Ceylon
People from Colombo
People from British Ceylon
Sri Lankan Tamil businesspeople
Sri Lankan Tamil politicians